Amateur is a 1994 crime comedy-drama film written and directed by Hal Hartley and starring Isabelle Huppert, Martin Donovan, Elina Löwensohn, and Damian Young. The story revolves around a former nun who gets mixed up in pornography, violence and international crime, but ends up intact in the convent she left.

Plot
Still a virgin after 15 years in a convent, the demure Isabelle earns her living in New York City by writing pornography, which she researches by buying magazines and hiring videos. In a café, she befriends Thomas, who has amnesia after falling from a window. In another café, an accountant called Edward is befriended by Sofia, who pushed Thomas out of the window because, she says, he introduced her to drugs at the age of 12 and made her into a celebrated porn actress. She now wants revenge on Jacques, a crooked businessman for whom both Thomas and Edward worked. Learning from Edward that Thomas has data on disk that could destroy Jacques, she steals Jacques' phone number from Edward's address book while he is in the restroom. Upon returning, Edward gives her the address of a house upstate where she can hide. After contacting Jacques to blackmail him, she meets Edward at Grand Central Terminal, where he mentions that Sofia should not talk about the disks with anyone, since Jacques kills anyone who knows about them. Having agreed to meet one of Jacques' men at Grand Central to give him the address to her apartment where the disks are, Sofia urges Edward to come with her to the house upstate, afraid both she and Edward will end up being killed. She then leaves the station only to see Jacques' hit men shoving Edward into a car. They take him to an abandoned building to torture him and leave him for dead.

Meanwhile, in a hired video Thomas sees Sofia in action and his memory starts returning. With Isabelle he retraces his steps and finds the flat where he and Sofia lived. Isabelle dresses in one of Sofia's sexy outfits and is on the point of losing her virginity to him when someone enters and the two hastily hide. It is Jacques' hit men looking for Sofia, who arrives shortly thereafter only to be tied up by the hit men who begin to torture her. Bursting out, Thomas and Isabelle throw one hit man out of the window and, freeing Sofia, make off with her in the other hit man's car. Sofia suggests they head for the empty country cottage Edward had told her about. On the way Isabelle posts the disks to her publisher, asking him to expose the evil of Jacques after having viewed the files while at the apartment.

When the surviving hit man traces them to the cottage, he wounds Sofia before being shot dead by Edward who arrives in a stolen car. The four make off before the police arrive and Isabelle directs them to her former convent, where they are given sanctuary and the dying Sofia is tended. But the convent is surrounded by armed police, who want Edward for murder. Thomas, his conscience awakened by the kindness and care Isabelle has shown, by the realisation of his criminal past, and by guilt over the fate of Sofia, walks out of the front gate and is killed instantly by a police marksman.

Cast
 Isabelle Huppert as Isabelle
 Martin Donovan as Thomas 
 Elina Löwensohn as Sofia 
 Damian Young as Edward
 Chuck Montgomery as Jan, first goon
 Dave Simonds as Kurt, second goon

Soundtrack

The soundtrack features excerpts from various alternative artists:

 "Mind Full of Worry" – The Aquanettas
 "Only Shallow" – My Bloody Valentine
 "Water" – PJ Harvey
 "Japanese to English" – Red House Painters
 "Shaker" – Yo La Tengo
 "Tom Boy" – Bettie Serveert
 "Girls! Girls! Girls" – Liz Phair
 "Then Comes Dudley" – The Jesus Lizard
 "Here" – Pavement

The soundtrack also included original music by "Ned Rifle" (a pseudonym used by Hal Hartley) and Jeff Taylor. It was released by Matador Records.

Reception
Review aggregator website Rotten Tomatoes retrospectively gave the film an approval rating of 79%, based on 28 reviews, with an average rating of 6.1/10.

Year-end lists 
 10th – Michael Mills, The Palm Beach Post

See also
 Isabelle Huppert on screen and stage

References

External links
 
 

1994 films
1994 comedy-drama films
1994 crime thriller films
1990s avant-garde and experimental films
1990s comedy thriller films
1990s crime comedy-drama films
1990s English-language films
American avant-garde and experimental films
American comedy thriller films
American crime comedy-drama films
American crime thriller films
American neo-noir films
British avant-garde and experimental films
British comedy thriller films
British crime comedy-drama films
British crime thriller films
British neo-noir films
English-language French films
Film4 Productions films
Films about amnesia
Films about nuns
Films about pornography
Films directed by Hal Hartley
British films set in New York City
Films shot in New York City
French avant-garde and experimental films
French comedy thriller films
French crime comedy-drama films
French crime thriller films
French neo-noir films
1990s American films
1990s British films
1990s French films